Jani Allan Kristian Liimatainen (born 9 September 1980) is a Finnish musician, songwriter and backing vocalist, currently a member of melodic death metal band  Insomnium. He is the former guitarist and one of the founding members of the power metal band Sonata Arctica. He has also performed with Cain's Offering, Altaria and Stratovarius vocalist Timo Kotipelto (his bandmate in Cain's Offering).

Most of his technique is self-taught, even though he had a few guitar lessons early in his life. He is endorsed by Ibanez, plays a Destroyer DT 200 Custom, the Ibanez JPM4 P4 (which is John Petrucci's signature model), and Ibanez "Streetwise" USA Custom guitars & Ibanez Rg 2020X. He cites Freak Kitchen, Dream Theater, and Pain of Salvation as his biggest musical influences.

He was born in Kemi, and currently resides in Kotka.

Biography 
Jani was one of the founders of Sonata Arctica in 1995. Besides playing, he also contributed to the band's songwriting with "My Selene" on 2004's Reckoning Night and "Prelude for Reckoning", their introduction tape in "For the Sake of Revenge". He has also co-written three songs for the band's first album, Ecliptica, "8th Commandment", "Replica" and "Picturing the Past".

In May 2007, as a result of his failure to do his mandatory civil/military service he spent one month in a Finnish prison until he decided to perform these duties, because of this he and the other members of Sonata Arctica reached an agreement that they would go their separate ways. He left the band on good terms and was then replaced by Elias Viljanen.

Jani also played with Altaria, recording two full-length albums, before leaving them to concentrate on his work with Sonata Arctica. In addition, he has (or possibly had) a melodic death metal side-project called Graveyard Shift with former Sonata Arctica band-mate Henrik Klingenberg. He also played in a band called Sydänpuu (Hearttree), that plays rock music in Finnish. In Sydänpuu, he sings and plays guitars, bass, and keyboards alongside drummer Risto Koskinen under the Alias of Allan Anderssén.

In October 2007, he was the lead guitarist for metal singer Paul Di'Anno's Finnish tour. Since mid-September 2007, Jani has worked with new band Dream Asylum with Altaria singer/songwriter and former band-mate Marko Pukkila. They are yet to make any formal releases but have recorded a few demos.

In April 2009, Jani announced on his MySpace page that he would be playing in a band by the name of Cain's Offering. Info about the new lineup was also released in the April issue of Burrn! magazine. Timo Kotipelto of Stratovarius and Mikko Härkin (ex-Sonata Arctica) were also a part of the band. The band has released two albums, Gather the Faithful in 2009, and Stormcrow (album) in 2015. They also released an acoustic covers album in 2012 titled Blackoustic.

In 2013, Jani Liimatainen contributed both lyrics and music on two tracks on Stratovarius' Nemesis. His band Sydänpuu released their first single, Malja in July 2013.

On 29 August 2017 it was announced that Jani would be collaborating with former Nightwish vocalist Anette Olzon for a project called The Dark Element. The debut self-titled album was released on 10 November 2017.

On 16 July 2019, Jani was announced as a full-time member of the band Insomnium, in conjunction with the announcement of their new studio album. He has toured on and off with the band since 2015.

In 2022, Jani released a solo album called My Father’s Son, which has several guest singers, including Timo Kotipelto and Anette Olzon.

Discography

Solo
My Father's Son (2022)

Sonata Arctica 

Ecliptica (1999)
Silence (2001)
Winterheart's Guild (2003)
Reckoning Night (2004)
Unia (2007)

Altaria 
 Invitation (2003)
 Divinity (2004)

Cain's Offering 
Gather the Faithful (2009)
Stormcrow (2015)

Stratovarius 
 Elysium (2011) – backing vocals
 Nemesis (2013) – Acoustic guitar, songwriting and backing vocals
 Eternal (2015) – Songwriting
 Survive (2022) - Songwriting

with Timo Kotipelto 
 Blackoustic (2012)

The Dark Element 
 The Dark Element (2017)
 Songs the Night Sings (2019)

Place Vendome 
 Close to the Sun (2017) – Songwriting

Insomnium 
 Heart Like a Grave (2019)
 Argent Moon EP (2021)

References

Finnish heavy metal guitarists
Sonata Arctica members
1980 births
Living people
People from Kemi
Seven-string guitarists
Cain's Offering members
Altaria (band) members
Insomnium members